"Locked in the Trunk of a Car" is a song by Canadian rock band The Tragically Hip. It was released in October 1992 as the lead single from their third studio album, Fully Completely. The song peaked at No. 11 on Canada's RPM Singles Chart.

Music video
The music video for the song features a transition between the band playing on a soundstage and a man locked in a car trunk with his hands tied in rope, as another man (played by the band's road manager Dave Powell) drives the car around the Canadian Prairies. The video was directed by Peter Henderson and produced by Eric Yealland. Cinematographer was Sean Valentini.

The video won the award for "Best Video" at the 1993 MuchMusic Video Awards. The video was also nominated in the "Best Video" category at the 1993 Juno Awards.

Covers
Singer-songwriter Justin Rutledge covered the song for his 2014 album Daredevil, an album consisting entirely of Tragically Hip covers.

Charts

References

External links

1992 singles
The Tragically Hip songs
1992 songs
MCA Records singles
Songs about crime
Songs about cars